Winfield is an incorporated village located in Milton and Winfield Townships, DuPage County, Illinois, United States. The population was 9,080 at the 2010 census and as of 2019, the estimated population was 9,636.

Winfield is home to Central DuPage Hospital, one of the largest hospitals in the Chicago suburbs.  Winfield has a Metra station on the Union Pacific/West Line, which provides regular commuter rail service to Chicago. Attractions adjacent to Winfield include the Forest Preserve District of DuPage County's Kline Creek Farm, a living history farm located on the west side of County Farm Road between Geneva and St. Charles Roads; and the McCormick Foundation's Cantigny Park, which includes public gardens, museums, golf courses, picnic grounds and hiking trails. Cantigny is located on the east side of Winfield Road, just south of Illinois Route 38, also known as Roosevelt Road. Winfield also enjoys parks and recreational services provided by the Winfield Park District. The Forest Preserve District of DuPage County also owns and operates several other open space areas surrounding Winfield. Winfield is considered to be among the safest towns in Illinois.

History 
Winfield originally tried to become an incorporated village in 1884 under the town name 'Frederick Park'. However, the motion was denied as the town did not have 300 residents as was required for incorporation. When the village was finally incorporated in 1921, the town had a population of 310 people.

The earliest settlers, Erastus and Jude P. Gary, came to Winfield in 1832. Winfield was originally known as Gary's Mill after these early settlers, and later, Fredericksburg, owing to a significant German-speaking population.  Before 1850, most Winfield residents were migrants from New England; however, by 1860, half of the residents were from Germany and Alsace-Lorraine. Winfield retained a community of German-speaking farmers until the 1920s. In the late 1800s, the settlement's name was changed again to Winfield after the war hero Winfield Scott.

Winfield was home to one of the oldest taverns in the Chicago suburbs, John's Restaurant and Tavern (formerly John's Buffet), founded in 1921 by immigrant John T Karwoski.  It closed its doors in December 2017. John Karwoski was instrumental in the political and economic development of Winfield, and it was his guidance and leadership that took a fledgling prairie town clinging to existence after the railroad boom went bust, and turned it into a viable and livable village. Mr Karwoski became the first Chief of the all-volunteer Winfield Volunteer Fire Company in 1935. 45 years later, his son John Karwoski II was made Chief of the expanded Winfield Fire Protection District in 1980.

Winfield was served by The Winfield Glimpses newspaper from October 1947 to October 1976. The Glimpses changed its name to the Winfield Examiner in November 1976 and ran until February 1992.  A full collection of these newspapers is available on microfilm at the Winfield Public Library.

Historical places

Schmidt's Pond 
Winfield is also home to another remnant of the past, called Schmidt's Pond.  In the late 1800s, Peter Schmidt dug a pond to provide a place to harvest ice in the winter.  Schmidt used the ice for his meat market, but also provided ice to the village in general.  The property which is located between Park Street and Summit Avenue, just south of Town Center Winfield, also featured an ice house to store the harvested ice.  While the ice house has since been turned into a private residence, the pond survives. The pond all but disappeared in the 1970s and 1980s due to lowering water tables, but has since returned, thanks in part to the village hooking up to Lake Michigan for its primary water use and a rising water table.  The pond is home to many ducks, geese, muskrat, crayfish, frogs, toads and fish, and while the pond is on private property, it can be seen from Park Street and Summit Avenues. Numerous lots adjacent to Schmidt's Pond today are open lots left this way intentionally for flood control purposes.

Hedges Station "Besch House" 

Hedges station is the oldest train depot in Illinois. It was built in 1849 on the west side of Church Street, where the police station is currently standing. In 1977, Winfield Township bought the station after all the owners had died. Their plan to demolish the building to construct a parking lot and more village offices was opposed by citizens who wanted the oldest building standing in Winfield to be turned into a historical site instead. After many arguments, the Township decided to move into another location. In 1981, Hedges station was moved to Winfield road, where it is currently located, and is now a museum.

Chicago-Winfield Sanitarium 
In 1897, a rest home was constructed in Winfield. This rest home was owned by Jessie P. Forsythe until she retired in 1908 and sold it to Emanuel Mandel. In 1909, the home was reconstructed into the Chicago-Winfield Tuberculosis Sanitarium. As tuberculosis became a curable disease, the Sanitarium saw a decrease in patients and eventually all were transferred to Michael Reese in Chicago. Then, in 1962, the Sanitarium was purchased by the Central DuPage Hospital Association.

The Samuel and Eleanor Himmelfarb Home and Studio 
The Samuel and Eleanor Himmelfarb Home and Studio was constructed in the wooded outskirts of western Winfield, IL in 1942 by the modernist artists.  The design was heavily influenced by the Usonian architectural styles of Frank Lloyd Wright.

St. John the Baptist 
St. John the Baptist Catholic Church was approved to be built on February 21, 1867. The residents of Winfield gathered their efforts and the church was erected later that year. The church even had its first baptism in 1867. On August 17, 1906, the church burned down in a thunder storm after it was struck by lightning. According to Louise Spanke, "only the altars, pews. stations of the cross, and communion rail could be saved." The church was completely rebuilt within a year.

Geography

Winfield is located at  (41.8776002, -88.1506695). Winfield is, by and large, surrounded by forests, including several DuPage County Forest Preserves on the north, west, and south. It borders Wheaton to the east, West Chicago to the west, Carol Stream to the north, and Warrenville and Naperville to the south.

In addition to the West Branch of the DuPage River, Klein Creek and Winfield Creek also flow through the village.

Parks and recreation

Public parks 
There are a total of 19 parks and facilities within the Village of Winfield, offering a variety of recreation uses.

Winfield Riverwalk Park 
The first phase of the Winfield Riverwalk Park opened in October 2021. The park is located just north of Jewel Road and west of Winfield Road, next to the existing regional trail running parallel to the DuPage River. Amenities featured in this first phase include new trails, bike repair and fitness stations, open space with 
wetland restoration, a new pollinator garden, a canoe/kayak launch, and access points for 
fishing. The Village also recognized the Knights of Columbus contribution of a new 
picnic shelter pavilion. Phase 2 will include a performance band shell, public washrooms, 
more trails, and additional public amenities, and is expected to be completed in 2022–2023.

Forest preserves 
Winfield is home to the Winfield Mounds Forest Preserve, named after the Native American burial mounds contained within the forest preserve. In addition to its western border with the Winfield Mounds Forest Preserve, the town is also bordered to the north by Red Hawk Park and Timber Ridge Forest Preserve, to the west by West DuPage Woods Forest Preserve, and to the southeast by Belleau Woods Forest Preserve. Forested areas surrounding Winfield comprise over 2,100 acres of land area. These areas have collectively been referred to as Winfield's green shoulder.

West Branch DuPage River Trail & Prairie Path 
Between 2016 and 2018, trail construction was carried out on the Winfield Mounds Trail Segment of the West Branch DuPage River Trail.  This segment goes through Winfield Mounds Forest Preserve, downtown Winfield and West DuPage Woods Forest Preserve.  This system will link the Illinois Prairie Path with existing trails to the southwest Naperville trail system creating a north–south connection that will provide recreational users more route options.

Golf 
Klein Creek Golf Club offers an 18-hole golf course. Cantigny Golf Club borders Winfield on its southeast corner.

Demographics
As of the 2020 census there were 9,835 people, 3,834 households, and 2,937 families residing in the village. The racial makeup of the village was 82.96% White, 1.50% African American, 0.12% Native American, 5.26% Asian, 0.01% Pacific Islander, 2.22% from other races, and 7.93% from two or more races. Hispanic or Latino of any race were 7.87% of the population.

There were 3,834 households, out of which 49.69% had children under the age of 18 living with them, 65.55% were married couples living together, 6.00% had a female householder with no husband present, and 23.40% were non-families. 22.01% of all households were made up of individuals, and 11.14% had someone living alone who was 65 years of age or older. The average household size was 2.94 and the average family size was 2.53.

The village's age distribution consisted of 20.5% under the age of 18, 6.2% from 18 to 24, 18.9% from 25 to 44, 35.6% from 45 to 64, and 18.8% who were 65 years of age or older. The median age was 48.8 years. For every 100 females, there were 101.6 males. For every 100 females age 18 and over, there were 98.3 males.

The median income for a household in the village was $125,481, and the median income for a family was $146,122. Males had a median income of $78,434 versus $60,421 for females. The per capita income for the village was $55,616. About 0.7% of families and 1.4% of the population were below the poverty line, including 1.8% of those under age 18 and 0.5% of those age 65 or over.

Education
The Village of Winfield is served by three school districts: West Chicago Elementary School District 33 (K-8, serving the north side of Winfield); Winfield Elementary School District 34 (K-8, serving the south side of Winfield); and Community Unit School District 200 (K-12, Wheaton-Warrenville, serving the east side of Winfield).  Winfield has no public high school, students from Districts 33 and 34 attend West Chicago Community High School, and students from CUSD 200 attend Wheaton North High School. It has three public elementary/middle schools, Winfield Primary School, Winfield Central School, and Pleasant Hill Elementary School, and one private elementary/middle school, St. John the Baptist Catholic School.

Winfield Central School 
Winfield Central School is located in downtown Winfield. Winfield Central School educates students from 5th to 8th grade. In 2020, there were 210 students whom attended Winfield Central School and 101 students that attended the Elementary school. Winfield's Elementary school is located directly across the street from its Central School. The middle school students are enrolled in physical education, one year of art, one year of music, two years of STEAM (science, technology, art, and mathematics), as well as a Spanish course every year (6-8).  Winfield Central School offers many extra curricular activities such as: World beat, Band, Basketball, Volleyball, Track, Drama, Soccer, Daily Herald Writing Club, etc.

Test Scores 2019:

Notable people 

 Christopher Bear (b. 1982), drummer and backing vocalist for Brooklyn-based indie rock group Grizzly Bear (Band) who has also collaborated with The Dirty Projectors, Fleet Foxes, and Beach House
 Wes Benjamin (b. 1993), pitcher with the Texas Rangers.
 Alex Benoit (b. 1995), competitive ice dancer, fourth place at 2017 U.S. Figure Skating Championships
 Michael Bowden (b. 1986), former pitcher with Chicago Cubs
 Chris Brown (b. 1981), running back with Houston Texans
 Carolena Carstens (b. 1996),  taekwondo olympian
 Dorothy Chang (b. 1970), composer born in Winfield
 Rob DeVita (b. 1965), football player for Seattle Seahawks
 Scott Michael Foster (b. 1985), actor
 John Warne Gates (1855–1911), pioneer promoter of barbed wire and founder of The Texas Company, a precursor to Texaco
 Sam Himmelfarb (1904–1976), American artist and commercial exhibit designer, known for his modernist-influenced paintings of everyday people and urban scenes
 Eleanor Himmelfarb (1910–2009), American artist, teacher and conservationist known for semi-abstract paintings referencing the landscape and human figure
 Michael Hodges (b. 1976), American fiction writer
 Frank Kaminsky (b. 1993), basketball player for the Atlanta Hawks
 Debbie Keller (b. 1975), retired soccer forward and former member of United States women's national soccer team
 Anthony Louis (b.1995), left wing/center for Chicago Blackhawks
 Philip Lutzenkirchen (b. 1991), American football tight end, who played at Auburn University, finishing his career as the school's all-time leading receiver in touchdowns among tight ends. 
 Andrew Marshall (b. 1984), defender with Crystal Palace Baltimore and Harrisburg City Islanders
 Walt Moryn (1926–1996), outfielder with Chicago Cubs and St. Louis Cardinals, lived and died in Winfield
 Jarett Park (b. 1981) professional lacrosse player
 Luke Putkonen (b. 1986), former pitcher for Detroit Tigers
 Rob Scahill (b. 1987), pitcher with the Chicago White Sox
 Shealeigh (b. 1998), singer
 Kevin Streelman (b. 1978), golfer on PGA Tour
 Bradie Tennell (b.1998), figure skater, 2018 U.S. national champion; 2015 junior national champion
 Nikos Tselios (b. 1979), defenseman with NHL's Carolina Hurricanes, Chicago Hounds, KalPa (Finland) and Färjestad BK (Sweden);  cousin of Chris Chelios
 William M. Whitney (1828–c. 1908), American politician
 Jonathan C. Wright (b. 1966), State's attorney for Logan County, Illinois
 Bobcat Goldthwait (b. 1962), Alleged comedian and director

Notes

References

Further reading

External links

 
 Winfield Park District
 Winfield Historical Society

 
1921 establishments in Illinois
Chicago metropolitan area
Populated places established in 1921
Villages in DuPage County, Illinois
Villages in Illinois